Holy Cross School, Najafgarh is a CBSE-affiliated Sr. Sec. School in New Delhi, India.

References

Schools in West Delhi
High schools and secondary schools in Delhi